Israel-British Bank was a bank founded on 21 October 1929 by Polish Jewish immigrants to Mandate Palestine as Immigrants Bank Palestine-Poland. The bank changed its name to Bank Ha'olim Erez-Israel-Polania on 20 April 1937.

History
Nahum Zeev Williams purchased Bank Ha'olim in 1938 and on his death the bank passed into the hands of a group headed by his family, associated with the Mizrachi movement.
 
On 6 April 1945 the bank changed its name to Palestine-British Bank. By 1961 it had branches in Tel Aviv, Jerusalem, Haifa, Nathanya, Jaffa, and London. On 1 August 1965 it became the Israeli-British Bank. On 1 October 1968 the London branch became a newly formed subsidiary under the title of Israel-British Bank (London).

In July 1974 the bank collapsed, owing British investors £46.6 million. Yehoshua Ben-Zion, the managing director of Israel-British Bank was convicted of embezzling £20 million ($39.4 million) from the bank. He was sentenced to 12 years in prison. After urging of the Israeli prime minister Menachem Begin in 1977, Ben-Zion was pardoned by the Israeli president Ephraim Katzir, on medical grounds. He was released after serving three years. He proceeded to live at least another 20 years, during which time he never paid the $40 million fine the court had assessed.

Although the Israel-British Bank was headquartered in the United Kingdom, the majority of its stockholders were Israeli. The Bank of England took the view that the bank's nationality was determined not by its place of incorporation but by the nationality of its stockholders, and refused to accept responsibility. Initially Israel did not accept responsibility either. Still, in mid-1975 the Israeli government agreed to permit the pooling of the London subsidiary's remaining assets with those of the parent to satisfy creditors.

The case Chase Manhattan Bank NA v Israel-British Bank (London) Ltd resulted when Chase Manhattan Bank sued Israel-British Bank for US$2million that Chase had inadvertently paid twice shortly before Israel-British went into liquidation. Israel-British knew that there had been an error but failed to return the money. The court ruled in Chase's favor.

References

Banking in Israel
Defunct banks of the United Kingdom
Banks established in 1929